The Safeguarding of Industries (Customs Duties) Act 1925 (15 & 16 Geo. V c. 79) imposed duties on cutlery, gloves, and incandescent mantles imported into Britain. Collectively, these industries amounted to approximately 3% of Britain's manufacturing output. The duties were temporary, remaining in effect for five years, from December 1925 to December 1930. For cutlery and gloves, the duties were 331/3% ad valorem, while for incandescent mantles the duty was 6 shillings per gross. These import duties were applied upon the recommendation of committees convened by the Board of Trade, in accordance with the 'safeguarding of industries' procedure, set out in a government White Paper in 1925.

Unlike the Safeguarding of Industries Act 1921, which was primarily intended to protect industries significant to national security, the Safeguarding of Industries (Customs Duties) Act 1925 was motivated by rising unemployment in those industries to which it applied safeguarding duties. The 1925 Act was the only piece of legislation solely arising out of the safeguarding of industries procedure. Other safeguarding duties were legislated as part of the Finance Acts of 1925-1928.

References 

Law of the United Kingdom
Economic history
Trade
Gloves